Ulysse or Ulysse et Pénélope (Ulysses or Ulysses and Penelope) is an opera by the French composer Jean-Féry Rebel, first performed at the Académie Royale de Musique (the Paris Opéra) on 21 January 1703. It takes the form of a tragédie en musique in a prologue and five acts. The libretto is by Guichard.

Recording
Ulysse. Les Solistes du Marais: Guillemette Laurens, Circé, Stéphanie Révidat, Pénélope, Bertrand Chuberre, Ulysse, Bernard Deletré, Urilas, Howard Crook, Orphée, Euriloque, Céline Ricci, Eugénie Warnier, Vincent Lièvre-Picard, Thomas van Essen, Le Chœur du Marais, La Simphonie du Marais, conducted by Hugo Reyne. Recorded 9-10 July 2007. [Saint-Sulpice-le-Verdon, Vendée]: Conseil Général de la Vendée, Ⓟ 2007. Musiques à la Chabotterie 605003

Sources
 Félix Clément and Pierre Larousse Dictionnaire des Opéras, Paris, 1881, p.682.

Compositions by Jean-Féry Rebel
French-language operas
Tragédies en musique
Operas
1703 operas
Operas based on the Odyssey
Works based on Les Aventures de Télémaque